Balukan may refer to:
 Balukan, Ardabil
 Balakan, Iran (disambiguation), two places